Sphagemacrurus is a genus of rattails.

Species
There are currently six recognized species in this genus:
 Sphagemacrurus decimalis (C. H. Gilbert & C. L. Hubbs, 1920)
 Sphagemacrurus gibber (C. H. Gilbert & Cramer, 1897)
 Sphagemacrurus grenadae (A. E. Parr, 1946) (Pugnose grenadier)
 Sphagemacrurus hirundo (Collett, 1896) (Swallow grenadier)
 Sphagemacrurus pumiliceps (Alcock, 1894) (Dwarf whiptail)
 Sphagemacrurus richardi (M. C. W. Weber, 1913) (Richard's whiptail)

References

Macrouridae
Marine fish genera
Taxa named by Henry Weed Fowler